Stenosis of the pulmonary artery is a condition where the pulmonary artery is subject to an abnormal constriction (or stenosis). Peripheral pulmonary artery stenosis may occur as an isolated event or in association with Alagille syndrome, Berardinelli-Seip congenital lipodystrophy type 1, Costello syndrome, Keutel syndrome, nasodigitoacoustic syndrome (Keipert syndrome), Noonan syndrome or Williams syndrome.

It should not be confused with a pulmonary valve stenosis, which is in the heart, but can have similar hemodynamic effects. Both stenosis of the pulmonary artery and pulmonary valve stenosis are causes of pulmonic stenosis.In some cases it is treated with surgery.

References

External links 

Congenital vascular defects